Denys Volodymyrovych Ostrovskyi (born 20 August 1998) is a Ukrainian professional footballer who plays as a left winger for Polish club Tomasovia Tomaszów Lubelski.

References

External links
 Profile on Podillya Khmelnytskyi Rih official website
 

1998 births
Living people
Footballers from Kyiv
Ukrainian footballers
Association football forwards
FC Obolon-2 Kyiv players
FC Obolon-Brovar Kyiv players
FC Kremin Kremenchuk players
FC Polissya Zhytomyr players
FC Podillya Khmelnytskyi players
Olimpia Elbląg players
Tomasovia Tomaszów Lubelski players
Ukrainian First League players
Ukrainian Second League players
II liga players
IV liga players
Ukrainian expatriate footballers
Expatriate footballers in Poland
Ukrainian expatriate sportspeople in Poland